Toonzai (formerly known as The CW4Kids from May 24, 2008 to August 7, 2010, or stylized as TOONZAi) was an American Saturday morning cartoon children's television block that aired on The CW from May 24, 2008 to August 18, 2012. The block was created as a result of a four-year agreement between 4Kids Entertainment and The CW. The original name for the block from May 24, 2008 to August 7, 2010, The CW4Kids (stylized as THE CW4K!DS), was retained as a sub-brand through the end of the block's run in order to fulfill branding obligations per 4Kids Entertainment's contract to lease The CW's Saturday morning time slots. The name is a portmanteau of "toon" and the Japanese term banzai, reflecting the majority of anime programming on the block.

The block was replaced by Saban Brands' program block Vortexx, which debuted on August 25, 2012. On April 11, 2013, the Toonzai website redirected to the Vortexx website. Since October 4, 2014, none of 4Kids' shows air on broadcast television anymore (with the exceptions of Pokémon, Yu-Gi-Oh!, TMNT, and Sonic X), as Vortexx ended its run on September 27, 2014, and before being replaced by Litton Entertainment's One Magnificent Morning.

History

Origin and launch
On October 2, 2007, The CW announced due to a joint decision between the network's parent companies Time Warner and CBS Corporation that it would discontinue the Kids' WB programming block, due to the effects of children's advertising limits and competition from cable television, and sell the programming time to 4Kids Entertainment. Kids' WB ended its run on The CW on May 17, 2008 (Kids' WB, like The WB Television Network that the block originated, then relaunched as an online-only video on demand service). 4Kids Entertainment took over programming the block on May 24, 2008, premiering under the name The CW4Kids. In addition to programming the block, 4Kids also handled responsibilities for its content and advertising revenue.

At the time of the block's launch, 4Kids also programmed the competing 4Kids TV block for Fox, until that network nullified its time leasing agreement with 4KidsTV on December 27, 2008, due to a dispute between Fox and 4Kids involving 4Kids' failure to pay the network for its time lease, and the network's inability to maintain guaranteed clearances for the block, due to difficulties getting Fox affiliates and stations that would be used as default carriers of the block in markets where the Fox station did not carry 4Kids TV to air it.

On April 27, 2010, 4Kids announced the rebranding of The CW4Kids under the new name Toonzai, a name change that took effect on August 14, 2010.

Takeover by Saban Brands and end of Toonzai
On June 26, 2012, Kidsco Media Ventures, an affiliate of Saban Capital Group, finalized a bid to acquire 4Kids' agreement with The CW for the block. On July 2, 2012, it was announced that Saban Brands, via Kidsco Media Ventures, began programming the block, which would be relaunched under the name Vortexx. Toonzai quietly ended its run on The CW on August 18, 2012, after a Yu-Gi-Oh! marathon, with Vortexx premiering the following week on August 25, 2012. Some of Toonzai's programming, including Yu-Gi-Oh!, Yu-Gi-Oh! Zexal, Sonic X, and Dragon Ball Z Kai continued to air on the block until September 27, 2014, when Vortexx ended its run.

Programming
It was the final children's block on The CW to be broadcast only in standard definition, because blocks like Litton's Weekend Adventure on ABC and NBC Kids were broadcast in high definition.

Programming differences
In most markets, CW affiliates used the network's recommended Saturday morning scheduling for the block – though some such as CW owned-and-operated station WUPA in Atlanta aired it on Sunday, instead due to regular Saturday programming. Connecticut affiliate WCCT-TV aired three hours on Saturday, and two hours on Sunday. KMAX-TV in Sacramento, California aired the entire lineup, but it had a four-hour tape delay, running from 11:00 a.m. to 4:00 p.m. WLFL in Raleigh, North Carolina and WNUV in Baltimore, aired the entire lineup, but it had two hours earlier, running from 5:00 a.m. to 10:00 a.m. San Diego's XETV-TV, aired three hours from 5:00 a.m. to 8:00 a.m. and two hours from 10:00 a.m. to Noon. San Antonio's KMYS, which affiliated with The CW in 2010, aired it on Sunday and Monday before 5:00 a.m. Other stations preempted portions of the block, Shreveport, Louisiana's KPXJ-TV preempted the final hour of the block. Columbus, Georgia's WLTZ-DT2 preempted the first half-hour of the block.

While The CW recommended that its affiliates carry The CW4Kids/Toonzai block at 7:00 a.m. to Noon Saturday mornings (regardless of time zone), its secondary CW Plus national feed for smaller markets aired the Toonzai block an hour earlier on its broadcast and cable-only affiliates in the Central, Mountain and Alaska time zones, as The CW Plus operates two separate feeds running on Eastern and Pacific time zone schedules. The only exception was in Boise, Idaho, where they had two CW networks (both The CW and The CW Plus), The CW Plus affiliate (now a MeTV affiliate) KNIN-DT2 carried the block (also aired an hour earlier), but the main CW affiliate (now a Fox affiliate) KNIN-TV declined to carry the block or the block's predecessor Kids' WB upon becoming a charter CW affiliate after the affiliation switch from UPN in September 2006; KNIN-TV instead carried syndicated E/I programming in the station's Saturday morning timeslot, making Boise one of the only television markets where Kids' WB and The CW4Kids was not available through over-the-air analog broadcasts before the KNIN-TV's analog signal shutdown on June 12, 2009.

Former programming

The CW4Kids

Programming from 4Kids TV

Acquired programming

† - Program transitioned from final schedule of Kids' WB
‡ - Program transitioned to Toonzai

Toonzai

Programming from 4Kids TV

Acquired programming

† - Program transitioned to Vortexx

Short segments
 Pat & Stan
 Magical DoReMi Witchling Sing-along
 TMNT: Mayhem at Mutant Island
 GoGoWiki (GoGoRiki)
 GoTunes (GoGoRiki)
 The CW4Kids Vault (Viva Piñata, Skunk Fu!)

Programming blocks
 Popcorn for Breakfast – consisted of movies distributed by 4Kids Entertainment, like Kirby: Fright to the Finish!! and Turtles Forever.
 Dinosaurs and Dueling (8am–10am) – consisting of two new episodes of Dinosaur King and two episodes of the original Yu-Gi-Oh!.
 Full Hours (8am–Noon) – consisting of one full hour of Dinosaur King, one full hour of Teenage Mutant Ninja Turtles, one full hour Sonic X, and one full hour of Yu-Gi-Oh!.
 Saturday Morning Superstars (9am–Noon) – consisting of two episodes of Teenage Mutant Ninja Turtles, two episodes of Sonic X, and two episodes of Yu-Gi-Oh! (part of Full Hours).
 The Fast and The Fierce (10am-11am) – consisting of two episodes of Sonic X (part of Full Hours). Title is a parody of The Fast and the Furious.
 Double Vision Saturday (10am–Noon) – consisting of two episodes of Sonic X and two episodes of Yu-Gi-Oh! (part of Full Hours).

Film airings
 Kirby: Fright to the Finish!! (September 12, 2009)
 Turtles Forever (November 21, 2009, March 20, 2010, May 29, 2010, and August 28, 2010)

See also

 4Kids TV - predecessor of TheCW4Kids/Toonzai block ran on Fox from September 14, 2002 to December 27, 2008.
 4Kids Entertainment - entertainment company that programmed both blocks.

References

Television programming blocks in the United States
The CW
4Kids Entertainment
 
Brokered programming
2008 American television series debuts
2012 American television series endings
Television channels and stations established in 2008
Television channels and stations disestablished in 2012